Wentworth Cheswell (11 April 1746 – 8 March 1817) was an American assessor, auditor, Justice of the Peace, teacher and Revolutionary War veteran in Newmarket, New Hampshire. Elected as town constable in 1768, he was elected to other positions, serving in local government every year but one until his death.

Some sources consider Cheswell to be the first African American elected to public office in the history of the United States, as well as the first African American judicial officer. Others are less sure, noting he was biracial and recorded as "white" in censuses.

Around the time of his marriage, Wentworth purchased a plot of land from his father Hopestill. His grandfather Richard is believed to be the first African American in New Hampshire to own land. A deed shows that Richard purchased  from the Hilton grant in 1717. In 1801, Wentworth was among the founders of the first library in the town and provided in his will for public access to his personal library.

Early life and education
Wentworth was the only child born in Newmarket, New Hampshire, to Hopestill Cheswell, a free black man of biracial ancestry, and his wife, Katherine (Keniston) Cheswell, a white woman.  The senior Cheswell was a master housewright and carpenter who worked mostly in the thriving city of Portsmouth.  Among other projects, Cheswell helped to build the Bell Tavern on Congress Street and the John Paul Jones House, originally owned by Captain Gregory Purcell and now a designated National Historic Landmark.  The Jones house was an example of classic mid-eighteenth century elite housing.  The Jones House for years served (and continues to) as the Portsmouth Historical Society Museum. Cheswell also built the Samuel Langdon House, which was moved to Sturbridge Village; it is a central exhibit demonstrating 18th-century construction technology.

Hopestill Cheswell was born free to a white mother and Richard Cheswell, an indentured black laborer in Exeter, New Hampshire, who was the first Cheswell recorded in New England. (Because his mother was free, the boy was free, according to the principle of partus sequitur ventrem, by which children followed the mother's status, which was incorporated into slave law in the colonies.) After completing his servitude, Richard Cheswell purchased  of land from the Hilton Grant.  The deed, dated 18 October 1717, is the earliest known deed showing land ownership by a black man in present-day New Hampshire.  The land was located in what was to become the town of Newmarket.  Hopestill was the only known child of this union.

Later, he had part ownership of a sawmill and stream in Durham, New Hampshire, as well as "mill privilege" at another falls, to handle his need for lumber. His prosperity helped provide for his son's education.

He sent his son Wentworth to Governor Dummer Academy in Byfield, Massachusetts. There the youth studied with the Harvard graduate William Moody, who taught the classical subjects of Latin and Greek, reading, writing, and arithmetic, as well as swimming and horsemanship. 

As Erik Tuveson noted in his master's thesis on the first three generations of Cheswells, the youth's education was:
an unusual privilege for a country boy of that time. Few people of the colonial era were formally educated, mostly due to cost and lack of inexpensive public schooling. Education of any formal sort in colonial New England carried a significant degree of elite social status.

Early career
After completing his education, Wentworth Cheswell returned to Newmarket to become a schoolmaster. In 1765, he purchased his first parcel of land from his father. By 1770, he owned .

Cheswill was first elected to public office in 1768 as the town constable, and later was elected to local offices every year (except for 1788) until his death in 1817, to positions such as town selectman, auditor, assessor, and others. In 2008, George Mason University in Virginia declared Wentworth Cheswell to be the first African American elected to public office in the history of the United States. He preceded Alexander Twilight of Vermont (1836), Joseph Hayne Rainey of South Carolina (1870), and John Mercer Langston of Virginia (1888) for the title.

Marriage and family
Cheswell married 17-year-old Mary Davis of Durham on 13 September 1767.  Eleven months later, the first of their 13 children was born.  Their children were: Paul (1768), Thomas (1770), Samuel (1772), Sarah (1774), Mary (1775), Elizabeth (1778), Nancy (1780), Mehitable (1782), William (1785), a daughter (name unknown) (1785), Martha (1788), a daughter (name unknown) (1792), and Abigail (1792).

Son Thomas Cheswell attended Phillips Exeter Academy and later became a deacon. Thomas' wife and children remained in Newmarket, and are buried in Riverside Cemetery.

Revolutionary War
During the American Revolutionary War, the citizens of Newmarket, including Cheswell, were unequivocally for the patriotic cause.  In April 1776, along with 162 other Newmarket men, Cheswell signed the Association Test.  Patriots collected signatures of people opposed to what they considered the hostile actions by the British fleets and armies. The abundance of the returns gave the signers of the Declaration of Independence assurance that their acts would be sanctioned and upheld by most of the colonists.

He was elected town messenger for the Committee of Safety, which entrusted him to carry news to and from the Provincial Committee at Exeter. On  13 December 1774, Paul Revere was dispatched to Portsmouth to warn the town that the British warships, frigate  and the sloop of war Canseau, were on their way to reinforce Fort William and Mary (known as "The Castle") and seize its powder and arms. When Portsmouth asked for help from neighboring communities, Newmarket held a town meeting to decide on their response. Townsmen voted to send 30 armed men to Portsmouth. Cheswell rode to Exeter to receive instructions from the Provincial committee on where the men were to be sent. He was also with the party which built rafts to defend Portsmouth Harbor.

On the morning of 14 December 1774, John Langdon made his way through Portsmouth with a drummer, collecting a crowd to descend on the fort. Several hundred men responded to his call, setting out for The Castle by way of the Piscataqua River. The colonists removed 100 barrels of gun powder, light cannons, and small arms. These captured supplies were later used by New Hampshire's forces against the British military, including at the Siege of Boston.

As a private, Cheswell served under Langdon in a select company called "Langdon's Company of Light Horse Volunteers", which helped to bolster the Continental Army at the Saratoga campaign. Langdon's company of Light Horse Volunteers made the 250-mile march to Saratoga, New York, to join with the Continental Army under General Horatio Gates, defeating British General John Burgoyne at the Battle of Saratoga, which was the first major American victory in the Revolution. Cheswell's only military service ended 31 October 1777. As with many other men, he served for a limited time, as his family was dependent on him for support.

Local leader
After his service in the war, Cheswell returned to Newmarket and continued his work in town affairs.  He also ran a store next to the school house.  Cheswell supported his family as a teacher, and was elected and appointed to serve in local government for all but one year of the remainder of his life, as selectman, auditor, assessor, scrivener, and other roles. In 1778, Cheswell was elected to the convention to draft New Hampshire's first constitution, but he was unable to attend.

He was interested in artifacts from the town and wrote about his studies; he has been called the first archeologist in New Hampshire for his work. The scholars W. Dennis Chesley and Mary B. Mcallister have said, "Cheswell's writings clearly contain the seeds of modern archaeological theory.  His eighteenth century fieldwork and reports, limited though they were, justify calling him New Hampshire's first archaeologist." Unfortunately The New Hampshire Archaeological Society has not taken the step to officially bestow the honor to him. 

In 1801, Cheswell and other men established the first library in Newmarket, the Newmarket Social Library.  Of the estates of men who started the library, Cheswill's was valued the highest at over $13,000.  In his will he stated,
 
I also order and direct that my Library and collection of Manuscripts be kept safe and together…if any should desire the use of any of the books and give caution to return the same again in reasonable time, they may be lent out to them, provided that only one book be out of said Library in the hands of any one at the same time.

Cheswell was a self-appointed town historian.  As scrivener, he copied many of the town records going back as far as the towns incorporation in 1727, including two regional Congregational Church meetings.  He collected stories and took notes of town events as they occurred. Jeremy Belknap, who wrote a three-volume History of New Hampshire, quoted Cheswill more than once at length in his work, and credited him for his local histories. They corresponded several times.

In 1805, Cheswell was elected as the Justice of the Peace for Rockingham County, making him the first African-American judge in U.S. history. In that position, he executed deeds, wills, and legal documents, and was a justice in the trial of causes.  He served as Justice until typhus fever caused his death on 8 March 1817, a month before his 71st birthday.

In his will, Cheswell requested that:
the burying place in the orchard near my dwelling house be fenced with rocks, as I have laid out (if I should not live to finish it) and grave stones be provided for the graves therein....

His original will is available to view at NH Records and Archives located at 9 Ratification Way in Concord, NH.

His daughter Martha, as his last surviving heir, provided the following in her will:
the burying yard at my farm as now fenced in, for a burying place for all my connections and their descendants forever…on the express condition that they and their heirs and assigns shall forever maintain and support the fence around said burying yard in as good condition as it now is.... 

Her original will is available to view at NH Records and Archives located at 9 Ratification Way in Concord, NH.

Legacy
 In 1820, shortly after Cheswill died, the New Hampshire Senator David L. Morril used him as a positive example of the contributions of mixed-race persons in a speech to the United States Congress regarding the negative effects of discriminatory racial legislation.  Morril opposed a bill to forbid mulatto persons to become citizens of Missouri.  In his speech Morril noted,

"In New Hampshire there was a yellow man by the name of Cheswell [sic], who, with his family, were respectable in points of abilities, property and character.  He held some of the first offices in the town in which he resided, was appointed Justice of the Peace for that county, and was perfectly competent to perform with ability all the duties of his various offices in the most prompt, accurate, and acceptable manner."  Angrily, Morril added, "But this family are forbidden to enter and live in Missouri."

Note: Cheswell was listed as white on the census, but Morril's reference suggests he was considered mulatto by some contemporaries.

Wentworth's grandfather Richard Cheswell, a former slave of African ancestry, is the first known resident by that surname in New England; all descendants share his African ancestry, as well as that of his English wife. PBS Frontline discussed the Cheswell family as among mixed-race American families in Blurred Racial Lines of Famous Families, associated with its program Secret Daughter (1996), based on June Cross' memoir.

In 2006, Cheswell descendants and other New England residents raised funds to restore or replicate the Cheswell gravestones. In addition, they and members of the New Hampshire Old Graveyard Association worked to clean up the old Cheswell gravesite. Some Cheswell descendants, whose families have identified as white for many generations, discovered their connection to the Cheswells and African-American heritage due to publicity in 2002 and following years of research about Wentworth Cheswell done by Rich Alperin, a local resident. He also brought notice to an unpublished master's thesis by Erik R. Tuveson about the first three generations of Cheswells and other people of color in New Hampshire. It is available at the University of New Hampshire.

In 2007, a New Hampshire historical marker (number 209) highlighting Wentworth's accomplishments was erected at the Cheswell gravesite in Newmarket.

Notes

See also
List of African-American jurists

References

Further reading
 Fitts, James Hill. History of Newfields, NH, Volumes 1 and 2 (1912).
 George, Nellie Palmer. Old Newmarket (1932).
 Getchell, Sylvia (Fitts). The Tide Turns on the Lamprey: A History of Newmarket, NH. (1984).
 Harvey, Joseph. An Unchartered Town: Newmarket on the Lamprey-Historical Notes and Personal Sketches.
 The Granite Monthly. Volume XL, Nos. 2 and 3.  New Series, Volume 3, Nos. 2 and 3 (February and March 1908).
 Knoblock, Glenn A. "Strong and Brave Fellows", New Hampshire's Black Soldiers and Sailors of the American Revolution, 1775-1784 (2003).
 Tuveson, Erik R. A People of Color: A Study of Race and Racial Identification in New Hampshire, 1750-1825. Thesis for M.A. in History (May 1995). Available at library of the University of New Hampshire.

External links
Mario de Valdes y Cocom, "Cheswell", The Blurred Racial Lines of Famous Families, PBS Frontline, 1996

The Wentworth Cheswill Appreciation Society

1746 births
1817 deaths
People from Newmarket, New Hampshire
Black Patriots
African Americans in the American Revolution
Free Negroes
African-American people in New Hampshire politics
New Hampshire militiamen in the American Revolution
People of New Hampshire in the American Revolution
People of colonial New Hampshire
The Governor's Academy alumni